Mikhail Syarheyevich Sivakow (born 16 January 1988) is a Belarusian footballer who plays as a centre-back for Orenburg.

Career

Club

Sivakow began his career with Smena Minsk, before joining BATE Borisov in January 2003 where he scored 14 goals in 83 games for the reserves. At the age of 17, he received interest from German club Borussia Dortmund but never signed for them. He started playing with the senior side in 2005, participating in 13 games and scoring one goal in the Belarusian Premier League.

On 31 January 2009, he was signed by Italian Serie A side Cagliari in 4-year contract.

He made his Serie A debut on 8 November 2009, replaced Davide Biondini in the last minutes, against Sampdoria. On 27 January 2010, he was loaned to Piacenza to swap club with Radja Nainggolan.

On 28 January 2011, Sivakow signed a half-year loan deal with Wisła Kraków. He was the most remembered for his 51,1 m goal against Lechia Gdańsk.

On 25 August 2011, Sivakow left Cagliari to join Belgian Pro League side Zulte Waregem. He signed a four-year contract with the club.

On 28 January 2015, Sivakow signed a six-month contract with Azerbaijan Premier League side Gabala FK, linking up with fellow former FC Chornomorets Odesa players, Dmytro Bezotosnyi, Oleksiy Gai, Ruslan Fomin and manager Roman Hryhorchuk. Sivakow left Gabala at the end of his contract.

In June 2015, Sivakow signed a two-year contract with FC Zorya Luhansk.

On 19 January 2017, he signed with a Russian Premier League side FC Orenburg.

On 17 June 2017, he signed a two-year contract with another Russian club FC Amkar Perm.

On 24 July 2018, he returned to FC Orenburg after Amkar was declared bankrupt.

International

Sivakow played with the Belarus national football team's under 17 side from 2004 to 2005, and in 2006 with the under 19 side. In 2008, Sivakow became a member of the under 21 squad. He played his first game for the squad on 14 October 2008 and scored a goal in the 39th minute against Turkey. Sivakow was a leading member of the under 21 side that participated in the 2009 UEFA European Under-21 Football Championship and exited at the group stage. Two years later, he captained the under 21 team that finished in 3rd place at the 2011 UEFA European Under-21 Football Championship and qualified for the 2012 Olympics. Sivakow appeared in all five of the matches.
He also captained the Belarus Olympic squad that participated in the 2012 Toulon Tournament, playing in all three of their matches and scoring one goal.
Sivakow made his debut for the senior national side of his country on 2 June 2010, in the 0:1 home loss against Sweden in a friendly match after coming on as a substitute for Sergey Omelyanchuk during the second half.

Personal life
His mother is of Polish descent.

Career statistics

Notes

International

Statistics accurate as of match played 9 June 2017

International goals
Scores and results list Belarus' goal tally first.

Honours
BATE Borisov
Belarusian Premier League champion: 2006, 2007, 2008, 2012, 2013
Belarusian Cup winner: 2005–06
Belarusian Super Cup winner: 2013

Wisła Kraków
Ekstraklasa champion: 2010–11

Belarus U21
UEFA European Under-21 Championship bronze: 2011

References

External links
 
 Player profile on official FC BATE website
 Football LineUps Stats
 

1988 births
Footballers from Minsk
Belarusian people of Polish descent
Living people
Belarusian footballers
Belarus youth international footballers
Belarus under-21 international footballers
Belarus international footballers
Association football midfielders
Association football defenders
FC BATE Borisov players
Cagliari Calcio players
Piacenza Calcio 1919 players
Wisła Kraków players
S.V. Zulte Waregem players
FC Gomel players
FC Chornomorets Odesa players
Gabala FC players
FC Zorya Luhansk players
FC Orenburg players
FC Amkar Perm players
Belarusian Premier League players
Serie A players
Serie B players
Ekstraklasa players
Belgian Pro League players
Ukrainian Premier League players
Azerbaijan Premier League players
Russian Premier League players
Russian First League players
Belarusian expatriate footballers
Expatriate footballers in Italy
Belarusian expatriate sportspeople in Italy
Expatriate footballers in Poland
Belarusian expatriate sportspeople in Poland
Expatriate footballers in Belgium
Belarusian expatriate sportspeople in Belgium
Expatriate footballers in Ukraine
Belarusian expatriate sportspeople in Ukraine
Expatriate footballers in Azerbaijan
Belarusian expatriate sportspeople in Azerbaijan
Expatriate footballers in Russia
Belarusian expatriate sportspeople in Russia